The Sri Lanka scimitar babbler or Ceylon scimitar babbler (Pomatorhinus melanurus) is an Old World babbler. It is endemic to the island of Sri Lanka, and was formerly treated as a subspecies of Indian scimitar babbler. The nominate form is found in the western part of wet hill regions of Sri Lanka, while race holdsworthi is found in the dry lowlands and eastern hills.

In culture
Most scimitar babbler species are referred as parandel kurulla by the Sinhala speaking community. The term 'parandel' refers to dried grass and probably refers to the color of the bird. The vernacular name of the bird parandel kurulla roughly translates to English as 'dried-grass colored bird'. This bird appears in a 4.50 rupee Sri Lankan postal stamp.

References

External links
 Internet Bird Collection

Sri Lanka scimitar babbler
Endemic birds of Sri Lanka
Sri Lanka scimitar babbler
Sri Lanka scimitar babbler